Sandlot ball or sandlot baseball is a competitive and athletic sports game that follows the basic rules and procedures of baseball. It is often less organized and structured, as the name alludes to a makeshift field or an empty lot.

History and origins 
It is thought that the term sandlot dates all the way back to the 1850s, originating in the city of San Francisco. At the time, a vacant lot sat near the San Francisco City Hall. This sandy lot became a place where workers and other citizens would meet and speak and voice their opinions.

This in-town park and empty lot next to City Hall also became a place where various sports could be played in a free and undisclosed area. Eventually the sport extended to lots all across the city of San Francisco (until the 1940s when there were no more made available or suitable enough for the game).

Sandlot baseball is a classic pastime. However, throughout the years, the culture surrounding it has changed and evolved.

Towards the beginning of its creation, sandlot ball revolved greatly around spontaneity, a lack of supervision, and a long, hot summer day. It maintained a casual nature, and rules were subject to change game-to-game or lot-to-lot. Young boys spent sun-up to sun-down on these fields.

Now, the sport is not as prevalent or casual as it once was. It is as though the traditional aspects of sandlot baseball are slowly but surely changing. This could be in part to several things, such as: the changing of the family structure in the United States, increasing technology (video games, cell phones, tablets, devices, television, etc.), and parents' fear of crime.

Some would argue that the constant changing in the culture surrounding sandlot baseball will eventually lead to its complete demise or extinction.

Function 
Sandlot baseball functions and serves as more than just a sport. Some argue that kids are able to learn more than just baseball when they are encouraged to play among themselves without adult supervision, rigid structure, or fixed rules.

It encourages players to think outside-of-the-box and think critically when there aren't enough players. It allows them to learn negotiation skills when deciding if a pitch was a strike or a ball, if a player was safe or out, or when a ball was fair or foul. It teaches them how to get along with one another, and permits them to work on organizational skills.

Media 

Sandlot ball is as well-known and widespread as it is today because of the influence of media and the film industry.

A film titled The Sandlot was released in 1993. A coming-of-age comedy set in the 1960s, the film follows a rag-tag group of pre-teen boys growing up in California. These boys spend their days playing baseball on a sandlot and finding themselves in a variety of adventures and mishaps. The film follows narrator and main character Scotty Smalls who is new in town. At first he is turned-down by this local group of boys whose lives wholeheartedly revolve around the sport, but as his knowledge of sandlot ball grows he begins to assimilate into the group well.

See also
 Corkball
 Half-rubber
 Scrub baseball
 Stickball

References

Baseball genres
Team sports